Sajjad Ahmed (born 14 February 1932) is a former cricketer who played first-class cricket in Pakistan from 1953 to 1968.

A medium-pace bowler, Sajjad Ahmed had a modest career except for two outstanding performances for Peshawar in the Quaid-e-Azam Trophy at the Peshawar Club Ground. In 1956–57, opening the bowling, he took 7 for 38 and 6 for 51 against Bahawalpur, yet Peshawar still lost by 144 runs. In 1958–59, again opening the bowling, he took 2 for 50 and 9 for 80 against Combined Services, but Peshawar lost by 185 runs. He was the third bowler to take nine wickets in an innings in the Quaid-e-Azam Trophy, after Fazal Mahmood and Israr Ali. He was selected in a President's XI against the touring West Indians later in 1958–59 in a match at the Peshawar Club Ground, but was given only three overs.

References

External links
 
 Sajjad Ahmed at CricketArchive

1932 births
Living people
Pakistani cricketers
Peshawar cricketers
Khyber Pakhtunkhwa cricketers
Cricketers from Peshawar